This is a list of defunct newspapers in Massachusetts, including print and online.

List of defunct newspapers

Boston
Newspapers published in Boston, Massachusetts:
 American Apollo
 The American Herald
 The American Journal, and Suffolk Intelligencer

 The Argus
 The Boston Chronicle
 The Boston Evening-Post
 The Boston Evening-post: and the General Advertiser
 The Boston Gazette
 Boston Gazette, Commercial and Political
 The Boston News-Letter
 The Boston Post-Boy
 The Boston Post-boy & Advertiser
 The Boston Price Current and Marine Intelligencer
 The Boston Weekly Advertiser
 The Boston Weekly News-letter
 Boston Weekly News-letter
 The Boston Weekly Post-boy

 The Censor
 The Columbian Centinel
 The Commercial Bulletin, 1859-1990
 The Constitutional Telegraph
 Continental Journal, and Weekly Advertiser
 The Courier
 The Courier. Boston Evening Gazette and Universal Advertiser
 The Courier. Boston Evening Gazette, and General Advertiser
 The Courier and General Advertiser
 Courier de Boston: affiches, announces, et avis
 The Evening Post; and the General Advertiser
 The Exchange Advertiser
 Federal Gazette and Daily Advertiser
 Federal Gazette and General Advertiser

 Federal Orrery
 Green & Russells Boston Post-boy & Advertiser
 The Herald of Freedom
 The Independent Advertiser
 Independent Chronicle
 The Independent Ledger and the American Advertiser
 J. Russell's Gazette, Commercial and Political
 The Liberator
 The Massachusetts Centinel
 The Massachusetts Centinel: and the Republican Journal
 The Massachusetts Gazette
 The Massachusetts Gazette. And Boston News-letter
 The Massachusetts Gazette, and the Boston Post-boy and Advertiser
 The Massachusetts Gazette; and the Boston Weekly News-letter
 Massachusetts Mercury
 Massachusetts Spy
 The Mercury
 The Morning Chronicle; and the General Advertiser
 The New-England Chronicle
 The New-England Courant

 The New England Weekly Journal
 Nocturnal Mail.
 Polar Star and Boston Daily Advertiser
 Polar-Star: Boston Daily Advertiser
 Russell's Gazette, Commercial and Political
 Saturday Evening Herald, and the Washington Gazette
 The Times, or, The Evening Entertainer
 The Weekly News-letter
 The Weekly Rehearsal
The Boston Daily Advertiser 
The Boston Journal
The Boston Phoenix
The Boston Post
The Boston Transcript

Brookfield
Newspapers published in Brookfield, Massachusetts:
 The Moral and Political Telegraphie, or, Brookfield Advertiser
 The Political Repository, or, Farmer's Journal
 The Worcester County Intelligencer, or, Brookfield Advertiser
 The Worcester Intelligencer, or, Brookfield Advertiser

Cambridge
Newspapers published in Cambridge, Massachusetts:

 The New-England Chronicle, or, The Essex Gazette

Charlestown
Newspapers published in Charlestown, Massachusetts:
 The American Recorder, and the Charlestown Advertiser

Dedham
Newspapers published in Dedham, Massachusetts:

 Columbian Minerva
 Minerva

Greenfield
Newspapers published in Greenfield, Massachusetts:
 Greenfield Gazette
 Greenfield Gazette. A Register of Genuine Federalism
 Greenfield Gazette. An impartial Register of the Times
 Greenfield Gazette, or, Massachusetts and Vermont Telegraphe
 The Impartial Intelligencer

Haverhill
Newspapers published in Haverhill, Massachusetts:
 Guardian of Freedom
 Haverhill Federal Gazette
 Impartial Herald
 The Observer

Holyoke
Newspapers published in Holyoke, Massachusetts:
 The Artisan
 Courrier de Holyoke; French language.
 Der Beobachter; German language, merged into Neu England Rundschau.
 Die Biene; German language.
 Gwiazda; Polish language.
 Holyoke Democrat.
 Holyoke Free Press.
 Holyoke Journal; German language, merged into Neu England Rundschau.
 Holyoke Transcript-Telegram
 Holyoke Weekly Mirror
 L'Annexioniste; French language.
 La Justice; French language.
 La Nueva Era; Spanish language.
 La Presse; French language.
 La Vérité, French language.
 Le Défenseur; French language.
 Le Progrès, French language.
 Le Ralliement; French language.
 Neu England Rundschau; German language.
 Teutonia; German language.
 Voice of Greece.; Greek language.
 Zeitgeist; German language.

Leominster
Newspapers published in Leominster, Massachusetts:
 Political Focus
 The Rural Repository
 The Telescope, or American Herald

Nantucket
 The Nantucket Beacon  (weekly)

New Bedford
Newspapers published in New Bedford, Massachusetts:
 Columbian Courier
 The Medley, or, Newbedford Marine Journal

Newburyport
Newspapers published in Newburyport, Massachusetts:

 The Essex Journal
 The Essex Journal and Merrimack Packet, or, The Massachu-setts and New-Hampshire general Advertiser
 The Essex Journal and New-Hampshire Packet
 The Essex Journal and the Massachusetts and New-Hampshire General Advertiser
 The Essex Journal, or, New-Hampshire Packet
 The Essex Journal, or, The Massachusetts and New-Hampshire general Advertiser
 The Essex Journal, or, The New-Hampshire Packet and the weekly Advertiser
 Impartial Herald
 The Morning Star
 The Newburyport Herald and Country Gazette
 Political Gazette

Northampton
Newspapers published in Northampton, Massachusetts:
 Hampshire Gazette
 Patriotic Gazette

Pittsfield
Newspapers published in Pittsfield, Massachusetts:

 Berkshire Chronicle
 Berkshire Chronicle, and the Massachusetts Intelligencer
 The Sun

Plymouth
Newspapers published in Plymouth, Massachusetts:
 The Plymouth Journal, and the Massachusetts Advertiser

Salem
Newspapers published in Salem, Massachusetts:
 The American Gazette, or, The Constitutional Journal
 The Essex Gazette
 The Impartial Register
 The Salem Gazette
 The Salem Gazette, and General Advertiser
 The Salem Gazette, or, Newbury and Marblehead Advertiser
 The Salem Impartial Register
 The Salem Mercury
 The Salem Mercury: Political, Commercial, and Moral

Springfield
Newspapers published in Springfield, Massachusetts:

 Federal Spy
 The Federal Spy and Springfield Advertiser
 Hampshire and Berkshire Chronicle
 The Hampshire Chronicle
 The Hampshire Herald
 The Hampshire Herald, or, The Weekly Advertiser
 The Massachusetts Gazette, or, The General Advertiser
 The Massachusetts Gazette, or, The Springfield and North-ampton weekly Advertiser

Stockbridge
Newspapers published in Stockbridge, Massachusetts:

 Andrews's Western Star
 The Western Star

Taunton
Newspapers published in Taunton, Massachusetts:
 The Taunton Democrat
 Union Gazette and Democrat
 Taunton Weekly Gazette
 The Household Gazette

Watertown
Newspapers published in Watertown, Massachusetts:
 The Boston-Gazette, and Country Journal

Worcester
Newspapers published in Worcester, Massachusetts:
 American Herald, and the Worcerster Recorder
 Haswell's Massachusetts Spy, or, American Oracle of Liberty
 The Independent Gazetteer
 The Massachusetts Spy, or, American Oracle of Liberty
 Thomas's Massachusetts Spy, or, the Worcester Gazette
 Worcester Evening Gazette
 Worcester Telegram
The Worcester Transcript

See also
 List of current newspapers in Massachusetts

Notes

References

Further reading

External links

 
  (Includes links to online versions of historic directories such as Pettingill's, Rowell's, Hubbard's, etc.)
 
 
 
 
 
 

</noinclude>

Mass media in Barnstable County, Massachusetts
Mass media in Berkshire County, Massachusetts
Mass media in Bristol County, Massachusetts
Mass media in Essex County, Massachusetts
Mass media in Franklin County, Massachusetts
Mass media in Hampden County, Massachusetts
Mass media in Hampshire County, Massachusetts
Mass media in Middlesex County, Massachusetts
Mass media in Norfolk County, Massachusetts
Mass media in Plymouth County, Massachusetts
Mass media in Suffolk County, Massachusetts
Mass media in Worcester County, Massachusetts
Non-English-language newspapers published in Massachusetts
Newspapers